Port River Expressway is a  freeway-grade road. The expressway links Port Adelaide and the LeFevre Peninsula across the north-western suburbs of Adelaide to major interstate routes via North-South Motorway.

The expressway is grade-separated at the North-South Motorway, Hanson Road and Eastern Parade interchanges. The next two intersections are at grade with traffic signals installed. This has led to the route being labelled as the A9, instead of the more common M label associated with freeways and expressways in South Australia.

Construction
The Port River Expressway was built in three stages: 
Stage 1 - Was opened for traffic in July 2005. It consists of a  four-lane expressway link between Francis Street and the then South Road, Adelaide, now the North-South Motorway; with an overpass at each of the junctions of the North-South Motorway, Hanson Road and Eastern Parade.
Stage 2 - Consists of a four lane high-level, opening road bridge across the Port River between Docks 1 and 2, linking Stage 1 at Francis Street to Victoria Road on Le Fevre Peninsula. This section opened in August 2008.
Stage 3 - Consists of a single track, dual gauge, high-level, opening rail bridge across the Port River, north of the road bridge, with connections to the existing rail system. Opened in June 2008.

Stage 1 connected at what had previously been a bend between extensions of South Road and Salisbury Highway, both of which had been extended in the early 1990s to meet each other. The original plan had been to install traffic lights at that intersection. Instead, an overpass was constructed with a loop through the Barker Inlet wetlands to provide a non-stop interchange.

The bridge for traffic travelling north on South Road to east on Salisbury Highway and east on Port River Expressway to south on South Road, was named the Craig Gilbert Bridge, after the lead designer of the overpass, who died of cancer before it opened. The bridge was opened and named in his honour in July 2005. It was demolished in May 2019 and replaced with a new Craig Gilbert Bridge, as part of the construction of the Northern Connector on the North–South Motorway, which included new wider bridges on a slightly more westerly alignment.

The Port River Expressway is now a major thoroughfare for freight and passenger road traffic travelling from the northern suburbs to the major port facilities of South Australia in Port Adelaide and Outer Harbor. The construction of Stages 2 and 3 was carried out by Abigroup.

During 2018, 2019 and 2020, construction workers were putting up new elements on the expressway, as part of the Northern Connector project of the North–South Motorway.

Cycling
As there is no parallel shared path near most of the Expressway and Salisbury Highway west of Port Wakefield Road, cycling is permitted on the road. The bridge over the Port River includes a shared path on the southern side of the road.

At the time of designing Stage 1 of the Expressway, the developers did not imagine that there would be much requirement for people to cycle along it, as Mawson Lakes had not been developed for housing yet, so the Port River Expressway was seen as only connecting industries to other industries.

Exits and interchanges
Port River Expressway is entirely contained within the City of Port Adelaide Enfield local government area.

Gallery

See also

 Freeways in Australia
 Freeways in South Australia
 Metropolitan Adelaide Transport Study

References

External links 
Transport SA - Port River Expressway

Highways in Australia
Roads in Adelaide
Freeways and highways in Adelaide